The Cincinnati Dutch Lions FC is an American amateur soccer club based in Cincinnati, Ohio, and playing home games in the suburb of Highland Heights, Kentucky. Founded in 2013, the team played in USL League Two. The club went into hiatus during the 2020 COVID-19 pandemic.

The club was last owned by majority stakeholder Hans Philippo, who purchased the club alongside Club President Robert Rack in January 2017. This new ownership group includes Dr. Suresh Gupta and Mike Mossel, in representation of the Dutch Lions Capital Group, who remain minority owners in the club. Brandon Ponchak was the club's general manager after being hired in March 2017.

Their inaugural match at the Xavier University Soccer Complex on May 9, 2014 featured an appearance by soccer legend Ruud Gullit as he participated in a "Kick the Crossbar" contest and a pre-game ceremony.

The Cincinnati Dutch Lions were created and owned by Dutch Lions Capital Group BV, owners of the New York City Dutch Lions, Dayton Dutch Lions, Florida Gulf Coast Dutch Lions, and the Houston Dutch Lions.

CDLFC has found success in their short time including an appearance in the 2016 Lamar Hunt U.S. Open Cup. The ownership group of Philippo and Rack have made several changes for the club's 2017 season including purchasing a charter bus for the team, moving to the NKU Soccer Stadium as their home field and the creation of a new bar in support of the club.

In November 2019, CDLFC became the first club to join the brand new Ohio Valley Premier League which began play in 2020. Later in 2020 the CDLFC returned to the USL League Two.

Seasons

The Premier Development League (USL PDL) rebranded to USL League Two (USL2) after the 2018 season.

^The 2020 season was cancelled due to the COVID-19 pandemic.

Venue
2014: Xavier University
2015: Xavier University
2016: William Mason High School
2017: Northern Kentucky University
2018: Northern Kentucky University
2019: Northern Kentucky University
2020: Northern Kentucky University

Kit

Kit manufacturers
2014: Nike
2015: Nike
2016: Patrick
2017: Under Armour
2018: Under Armour
2019: Under Armour
2020: Under Armour

Shirt sponsors
2014: N/A
2015: Holland Roofing
2016: Coca-Cola
2017: Mercedez-Benz of Fort Mitchell
2018: Mercedez-Benz of Fort Mitchell
2019: Mercedez-Benz of Fort Mitchell
2020: Mercedez-Benz of Fort Mitchell

Head coaches
  Terry Nicholl (2014–2016)
  Sid van Druenen (2017)
  Paul Nicholson (2018–2020)

Notable former players
 Yesin van der Pluijm signed in 2021 by Colorado Springs Switchbacks FC;
 Aimé Mabika 2021 MLS SuperDraft pick, 26th pick by Inter Miami CF
 Noah Lawrence 2021 MLS SuperDraft pick, 55th pick by Austin FC
 Brandon Clegg signed in 2020 by Detroit City FC
 Jimmy Filerman signed in 2020 by Detroit City FC; signed in 2021 by FC Tucson
 Connor Rutz signed in 2020 by Detroit City FC
 Azaad Liadi signed in 2020 by FC Tucson; signed in 2021 by South Georgia Tormenta FC
 Tendai Jirira signed in 2020 by Detroit City FC
 Wesley Storm signed in 2020 by ADO Den Haag
 Mark Lindstrӧm signed in 2020 by Pittsburgh Riverhounds
 Sammy Sergi signed in 2020 by New Mexico United
 Arthur Rogers signed in 2019 by Hartford Athletic
 Dani Fischer signed in 2019 by Saint Louis FC
 Matt Nance signed in 2019 by Tacoma Defiance
 Geoffrey Dee signed in 2019 by Louisville City FC
 Adam Wilson 2019 MLS SuperDraft pick, 39th pick by Toronto FC
 Kevin Barajas signed in 2018 by Atlanta United 2
 Zeus de la Paz signed in 2018 by Oldham Athletic AFC
 Jake Stovall 2017 MLS SuperDraft pick, 66th pick by Seattle Sounders FC. Played with Puerto Rico FC in 2017
 Garrett Halfhill signed in 2017 by FC Cincinnati
 Jalen Brown 2017 MLS SuperDraft pick, 38th pick by New York City FC. Played with Rochester Rhinos in 2017
 Oriol Cortes signed in 2016 by Orange County SC
 Kyle Smith signed in 2016 by Louisville City FC; signed in 2018 by Orlando City SC
 Alejandro Garcia signed in 2016 by Orlando City SC
 Eric Osswald signed in 2015 by Real Monarchs SLC

2019 Roster

See also 
Dayton Dutch Lions
Florida Gulf Coast Dutch Lions
Miami Dutch Lions

References 

USL League Two teams
Dutch Lions
Association football clubs established in 2013
2013 establishments in Ohio
Soccer clubs in Kentucky
Campbell County, Kentucky
Dutch Lions FC